Pingtan is a town in Yuechi County, Sichuan province, China. , it administers three residential neighborhoods and 18 villages: 
Neighborhoods
Xingping Community
Yuejiang Community
Jialing Community

Villages
Wulangmiao Village
Lujiaqiao Village
Majiagou Village
Cheduhe Village
Shuanghekou Village
Jiaodingpo Village
Ma'anzhai Village
Qilongzhai Village
Renhezhai Village
Dikeng Village
Shichuangou Village
Lianhua Village
Baohua Village
Shipanyan Village
Liaojie'an Village
Baishatuo Village
Fuxingsi Village
Baiyanggai Village

See also 
 List of township-level divisions of Sichuan

References 

Township-level divisions of Sichuan
Yuechi County